Paul Annacone and David Wheaton were the defending champions, but Wheaton chose not to participate. Annacone partnered with Doug Flach, but lost to Jim Grabb and Richey Reneberg in the first round.

Patrick Galbraith and Todd Witsken won the title, defeating Grant Connell and Glenn Michibata in the finals, 6–4, 3–6, 6–1.

Seeds
The top four seeded teams received byes into the second round.

Draw

Finals

Top half

Bottom half

References

External links
 1991 Canadian Open Doubles Draw

1991 ATP Tour